Echraf Abdallah (born 14 January 1987) is a Tunisian handball player for Megrine Sport HBF and the Tunisian national team.

She participated at the 2011 World Women's Handball Championship in Brazil, the 2013 World Women's Handball Championship in Serbia and 2015 World Women's Handball Championship in Denmark.

References

1987 births
Living people
Tunisian female handball players
Expatriate handball players